Spring cleaning is the practice of thoroughly cleaning a house in the springtime. The practice of spring cleaning is especially prevalent in climates with a cold winter. In many cultures, annual cleaning occurs at the end of the year, which may be in spring or winter, depending on the calendar.

The term is also used metaphorically for any kind of heavy duty cleaning or organizing enterprise. A person who gets their affairs in order before an audit or inspection could be said to be doing some spring cleaning.

History
Some researchers trace the origin of spring cleaning to the Iranian Nowruz, the Persian new year, which falls on the first day of spring. Iranians continue the practice of khaneh tekani (Persian: خانه‌تکانی; literally "shaking the house") just before the Persian new year.  Everything in the house is thoroughly cleaned, from the drapes to the furniture.

Another possibility has been suggested that the origins of spring cleaning date back to the ancient Jewish practice of thoroughly cleansing the home in anticipation of the springtime festival of Passover (Pesach).  In remembrance of the Israelites' hasty flight from Egypt following their captivity there, during the week-long observance of the Passover holiday, there are strict prohibitions against eating or drinking anything which may have been leavened or fermented (Exodus 12:15, 19).  Jews are not only supposed to refrain from leavened foodstuffs (chametz), they are expressly commanded to rid their homes of even small remnants of chametz for the length of the holiday (Exodus 12:15).  Therefore, observant Jews conduct a thorough "spring cleaning" of the house, followed by a traditional hunt for chametz crumbs (bedikat chametz) by candlelight on the evening before the holiday begins.

Traditionally, the Catholic church thoroughly cleans the church altar and everything associated with it on Maundy Thursday, the day before Good Friday, in the Spring. Spring cleaning persists today in Greece, and other Orthodox nations.  It is traditional to clean the house thoroughly either right before or during the first week of Great Lent, which is referred to as Clean Week. This also often corresponds with the Julian New Year, or April 1.

In North America and northern Europe, the custom found an especially practical value due to those regions' continental and wet climates. During the 19th century in America, prior to the advent of the vacuum cleaner, March was often the best time for dusting because it was getting warm enough to open windows and doors (but not warm enough for insects to be a problem), and the high winds could carry the dust out of the house. This time of year is also when coal furnaces wouldn't run and one could wash the soot from the walls and furniture left by the furnace.  For the same reason, modern rural households often use the month of March for cleaning projects involving the use of chemical products which generate fumes.

Other seasonal cleaning
Similar traditions have annual cleaning in winter.

In Scotland, "New Year's cleaning" is traditionally done on Hogmanay (December 31), a practice now also widespread in Ireland and North America.

In Japan,  is done in late December, before the new year on January 1. This was predated by the tradition of  during the Edo period (1603–1868), which was observed on December 13 and cleaned homes in order to welcome toshigami (gods of the year).

Among Neo-Pagans, biannual equinox cleanings are sometimes performed at the onset of spring and autumn, to symbolize beginning a new cycle with a clean spiritual slate.

"Diwali ki safai" in most parts of India is traditionally done a couple of days (or weeks) before the festival of Diwali.

See also

National Cleanup Day
World Cleanup Day
Khāne-takānī

References

Cleaning
Cleaning